"A Girl in Trouble (Is a Temporary Thing)" was a hit single for Romeo Void in 1984, from the Columbia album Instincts. It was the band's biggest hit and their only ever Top 40 hit single, peaking at number 35 on the Billboard Hot 100.

A music video was also made for the song, which included themes of paint, social commentary, body image, art, and stop motion animation. It got some MTV airplay.

Track listing

7-inch
"A Girl in Trouble (Is a Temporary Thing)"
"Going to Neon"

12-inch
"A Girl in Trouble (Is a Temporary Thing)" (Dance Mix)
"Six Days and One"

Charts

References

1984 songs
1984 singles
Romeo Void songs
Columbia Records singles
Song recordings produced by David Kahne
Songs written by David Kahne
Songs written by Debora Iyall